= Quaver's Marvelous World of Music =

Educational music web site

- Screenshot
- Website type: Educational Music Site
- Available in: English
- Owner: Quaver's Marvelous World of Music
- Revenue: From Micro-transactions
- Website: www.quavermusic.com
- IPv6 support: Yes, by arrangement or ipv6.google.com
- Commercial: Yes
- Registration: Required
- Launched: 2011
- Current status: Active

Quaver's Marvelous World of Music, commonly referred to on site as Quaver, Quaver Music, and Quaver's World is an educational music web site. It is used as a music curriculum in schools around the United States and the United Kingdom.

== Overview ==
The site was founded by David V. Mastran and Graham Hepburn. The site offers teaching tools for children about basic music knowledge.
